Marine Research were an indiepop/twee pop band, based in Oxford/London (UK), formed in 1997 by four of the five members of Heavenly (Amelia Fletcher, Peter Momtchiloff, Cathy Rogers and Rob Pursey), following the death of Heavenly drummer Mathew Fletcher. The band were joined on drums by DJ Downfall (John Stanley), who is also a solo recording artist.

After the band disbanded in 1999, vocalist and keyboardist Cathy Rogers moved to the United States, and became well known for producing and starring in the television show Junkyard Wars. Lead singer and songwriter Amelia Fletcher was also in the group Talulah Gosh and later recorded with Tender Trap, alongside bassist Rob Pursey and drummer John Stanley. Guitarist Peter Momtchiloff now plays in Would-Be-Goods, Speed of Sound and Scarlet's Well.

Sounds from the Gulf Stream 

The band recorded just one album; Sounds from the Gulf Stream, released on K Records (USA) and Elefant Records (Spain). Nods to Heavenly are present, especially in terms of the twangy guitar and multi-layered vocals.

Track listing
 "Parallel Horizontal" (3:21)
 "You and a Girl" (4:42)
 "Hopefulness to Hopelessness" (4:02)
 "Queen B" (3:54)
 "Chucking Out Time" (3:00)
 "Glamour Gap" (3:47)
 "At the Lost and Found" (2:37)
 "Venn Diagram" (2:57)
 "End of the Affair" (3:24)
 "Y.Y.U.B." (4:19)

Discography
 "Queen B" (7-inch single; 1998)
 "Parallel Horizontal" (EP; 1999)
 Sounds from the Gulf Stream (LP; 1998)
 "Sick and Wrong"/"By The Way" (split 7-inch with Built to Spill; 1999)

References

External links
Marine Research home page
Marine Research at Southern Records

K Records artists
British indie rock groups
English rock music groups
Musical groups established in 1997